Elachista brachypterella is a moth of the family Elachistidae that is  found in Italy and Austria.

References

brachypterella
Moths described in 1990
Moths of Europe